Kocuria indica is a species of bacteria in the genus Kocuria.

References 

Micrococcaceae
Bacteria described in 2014